"Fire Lake" is a song written and recorded by the American musical artist Bob Seger. He had planned to record "Fire Lake" for his 1975 album Beautiful Loser, but the track was not finished. The song had been partly written years before, in 1971, and was finally finished in 1979 and released in 1980 on Seger's album Against the Wind. The single reached number 6 on the Billboard Hot 100. A live version of the song appeared on the album Nine Tonight, released in 1981.

Background and writing
Seger and colleagues decided to make "Fire Lake" the first single from Against the Wind because it was "totally and unequivocally unlike anything I'd ever done before."
"The lyric is very ... different ... and very kind of unique. It's about taking risks. About risking love, chucking it all and just heading off with a bunch of wild people, whatever.
"It is one of my favorite lyrics down through the years, and the track is very unusual. It's sort of an R&B meets country kind of thing.
"I really wanted it to be the first single but I never thought Capitol would agree to it, and I believe it was Punch (Andrews, Seger's manager and often co-producer) who talked them into it. What I liked about it was that it broke new ground for us. It really showed that we were unafraid to push the envelope of what we were doing before, which was basically pretty hot rock and roll, you know, with a few ballads thrown in."

Reception
Music critic Maury Dean described the song as an "ominous ballad" about "4th of July fireworks."  Dean praised the song's intensity, Seger's vocal and the "nifty" minor chords the song uses.  Dean speculated that the title may not be entirely figurative, as there may be a hidden reference to a midwestern body of water which literally caught fire, the Cuyahoga River in Ohio.  Billboard described "Fire Lake" as an "excellent song [that] is paced by acoustic guitar which lends a folk flavor" and the lyrics as describing "the subversion of small-town life."  Cash Box said it has "full-bodied harmonies and an easy, country-tinged melody" and praised the production.  Record World called it "Dynamite!"  Classic Rock History critic Janey Roberts rated it as Seger's 14th best song.

Production
Three of the Eagles provided the backing vocals for this track: Glenn Frey, Don Henley and Timothy B. Schmit. Seger's recording engineer David Cole makes reference to the song on his website when he talks of his history with Seger: "I was there when the Eagles sang 'Who wants to go to Fire Lake?' and many other great moments during the Stranger in Town album".

Personnel
Credits are adapted from the liner notes of Seger's 2003 Greatest Hits 2 compilation.

Bob Seger – lead vocals

Muscle Shoals Rhythm Section
Barry Beckett – piano
Pete Carr – lead guitar, acoustic guitar
Roger Hawkins – drums, percussion
David Hood – bass
Jimmy Johnson – rhythm guitar
Randy McCormick – organ

Additional musicians
Glenn Frey – harmony vocals
Don Henley – harmony vocals
Timothy B. Schmit – harmony vocals

Chart performance

Weekly charts

Year-end charts

References

1980 singles
Bob Seger songs
Songs written by Bob Seger
1980 songs
Capitol Records singles
Song recordings produced by Bob Seger